The 2003 St Edmundsbury Borough Council election took place on 1 May 2003 to elect members of St Edmundsbury Borough Council in England. This was on the same day as other local elections.

The whole council was up for election on new ward boundaries. The number of seats increased by 1.

Summary

|}

By-elections

Risbygate

Haverhill East

Barningham

Haverhill South

Westgate

Kedington

References

2003 English local elections
May 2003 events in the United Kingdom
2003
2000s in Suffolk